Leptosia medusa, the dainty spirit, is a butterfly in the family Pieridae. It is found in Guinea-Bissau, Guinea, Sierra Leone, Liberia, Ivory Coast, Ghana, Togo and western Nigeria. The habitat consists of forests.

References

External links
Seitz, A. Die Gross-Schmetterlinge der Erde 13: Die Afrikanischen Tagfalter. Plate XIII 10

Butterflies described in 1777
medusa
Taxa named by Pieter Cramer
Fauna of Rivers State